Jolene Anderson (born 26 May 1980) is an Australian actress and singer.

From 2006 to 2008, she played the character of Erica Templeton on the drama series All Saints. She is also the winner of the second series of celebrity singing competition It Takes Two.

Career

Television
Anderson played Erica Templeton on All Saints until 18 November 2008, when her character was pronounced dead, as she had been missing for 3 weeks. She was one of the younger cast members and reputedly popular with the audience.

In the first episode of the 2007 season of It Takes Two, Anderson and her partner David Campbell performed "The Sweet Escape" by Gwen Stefani and scored eights from all four judges giving them a score of 32 and therefore being at the top of the leaderboard for the first episode of the series. She continued to score highly amongst the judges and was one of the favourites for the entire competition.  On 19 June 2007, she became the first contestant in the show to score a perfect ten from all four judges on both performances. Anderson and Campbell went on to win It Takes Two on 10 July 2007.

Anderson later accepted the role of "Our Girl" in the Andrew Lloyd Webber song cycle Tell Me on a Sunday. The production had mixed reviews, but Jolene's performance was generally well received, in her musical theatre debut.

Anderson hosted Bush Doctors in 2008, introducing and doing voice-overs during the show. The series aired from January to March 2008.

Anderson signed on to become a series regular in the Ten Network cop drama series Rush. Her character, Shannon Henry, made her debut in the series' second season which premiered on 16 July 2009.

In 2019 Anderson joined the cast of Harrow playing Dr. Grace Molyneux, a junior medical examiner with a mysterious past and Harrow's love interest for Season 2.

Theatre
From 14 November 2011 to 10 December 2011, Anderson was cast as the leading role of Hypatia, in Queensland Theatre Company's Fractions, by Marcel Dorney. Hypatia is a brilliant female mathematician and philosopher who, 1600 years ago, was responsible for the Library of Alexandria - a collection of all the knowledge in her world. When political turmoil runs unchecked, religious fanatics threaten to destroy the Library. As Hypatia struggles to save it, she is forced to confront her own prejudice, and to make a terrible choice.

Filmography

Film

Television

Awards 
Anderson has been nominated for a Logie Award in 2007 for Most Popular New Female Talent for her role as Erica Templeton in All Saints but lost out to Amy Mathews from Home and Away.

References

External links 
 
 [archive.org/web/20060615163216/https://web.archive.org/web/20060615163216/http://au.yahoo.com/it-takes-two/ It Takes Two official website] 
 All Saints official website

Australian film actresses
Australian musical theatre actresses
Australian television actresses
Singing talent show winners
Actresses from New South Wales
Living people
1980 births
People from the Mid North Coast
Australian children's television presenters
21st-century Australian actresses
21st-century Australian singers
21st-century Australian women singers
Australian women television presenters